is a 1988 Japanese film directed by Makoto Wada.

Cast
Kyōko Koizumi - Rumi Kato (Ruby)
Hiroyuki Sanada - Toru Hayashi
Kumi Mizuno - Toru's mother
Hideyo Amamoto
Masumi Okada
Takanori Jinnai - Rumi's friend
Taisaku Akino - Detective
Akira Nagoya - Man with white cloth

Awards and nominations
13th Hochi Film Award 
 Won: Best Actor - Hiroyuki Sanada
10th Yokohama Film Festival 
 Won: Best Actor - Hiroyuki Sanada
 Won: Best Actress - Kyōko Koizumi
6th Best Film

References

1988 films
Films directed by Makoto Wada
1980s Japanese-language films
1980s Japanese films